Vilma Chissola Ebo da Silva (born 3 June 1997) is an Angolan handball player for Primeiro de Agosto and the Angolan national team.

She represented Angola at the 2017 World Women's Handball Championship.

Achievements
Carpathian Trophy:
Winner: 2019

References

External links

Angolan female handball players
1997 births
Living people
Handball players at the 2014 Summer Youth Olympics
Competitors at the 2019 African Games
African Games competitors for Angola
African Games medalists in handball
African Games gold medalists for Angola